SNV, also known as VSS, is a sans-serif typeface used on road signs in several European countries. It was originally defined by the Association of Swiss Road Traffic Experts (German: Vereinigung Schweizerischer Strassenfachleute, VSS) and the Swiss Association for Standardization (Schweizerische Normen-Vereinigung, SNV). 

In Switzerland, it was replaced on road signs by ASTRA-Frutiger in 2003. It is still used on road signs in Belgium, Bulgaria, Luxembourg, Romania and the countries of the former Yugoslavia (Bosnia-Herzegovina, Croatia, Kosovo, North Macedonia, Montenegro, Serbia and Slovenia).

See also
List of public signage typefaces

References

Government typefaces
Sans-serif typefaces